Anderson is a surname deriving from a patronymic meaning "son of Ander/Andrew" (itself derived from the Greek name "Andreas", meaning "man" or "manly"). 

In Scotland, the name first appeared in records of the 14th century as "Fitz Andreu" (meaning son of Andrew), and developed in various forms by the Scottish Gaelic patronymic of "MacGhilleAndrais" which means "servant of St. Andrew". Variations of this name were MacAndrew, Gillanders and Anderson. The name soon migrated to other parts of Scotland due to the popularity of the name "Andrew" as associated with the Patron Saint of Scotland, and the largest grouping lies in the north-east of Scotland from the Mearns through Aberdeenshire, Banff, and Moray.

In England, the very first recorded spelling of the family name is probably that of William Andreu, which was dated 1237, in the ancient charters of the county of Buckinghamshire, England, in the year 1237.

Anderson is the eighth most frequent surname in Scotland and 52nd most common in England.

In Sweden, the form Andersson is the most common surname.

In Norway and Denmark, the form Andersen is quite common, being the fifth most common surname in both countries–see Andersen. It's also found to a lesser extent in northern Germany, e.g. the German vocalist Lale Andersen (1905–1972).

The Scandinavian forms Andersson and Andersen were often rendered as Anderson by immigrants to the English-speaking countries, whereby the latter form became one of the most common surnames in Anglophone North America. The name was the eleventh most common surname reported in the 1990 United States census, accounting for 0.3% of the population. It was the twelfth most common surname reported in the 2000 United States Census. Anderson is also one of the most popular surnames in Canada.

Other spelling variations include: Andison, Andersonne, Andersoun, Andirsoone, Andresoun, Androson, Andirston, Andresson, Andrewson, and Andresen.

People

A
Abdullah Anderson (born 1996), American football player
Adam Anderson (disambiguation)
Ago Anderson (born 1972), Estonian actor
Alan Anderson (disambiguation)
Alec Anderson (American football, born 1894) (1894–1953), American football player
Alex Anderson (disambiguation)
Alexander Anderson (disambiguation)
Alexandria Anderson (born 1987), American sprinter
Alf Anderson (1914–1985), American baseball player
Alfred Anderson (disambiguation)
Alice Anderson (disambiguation)
Ally Anderson (born 1996), Australian rules footballer
Amy Anderson (disambiguation)
Andrade Antunes Anderson (born 1981), Brazilian footballer
Andrew Anderson (disambiguation)
Andy Anderson (disambiguation)
Anna Anderson (1896–1984), impostor who claimed to be Grand Duchess Anastasia Nikolaevna of Russia
Anne Anderson (disambiguation)
Anna Lisa Andersson (1873–1958), Swedish reporter 
Anthony Anderson (disambiguation)
Arit Anderson, British garden designer, writer, and television presenter
Anton Anderson (1892–1960), American engineer and mayor of Anchorage, Alaska
Arnold Anderson (disambiguation)
Axel Anderson (1929–2012), German actor

B
Belinda C. Anderson (born 1954), American academic administrator
Ben Anderson (disambiguation)
Benedict Anderson (1936–2015), American social scientist and professor
Benjamin Anderson (disambiguation)
Bennie Anderson (born 1977), American football offensive guard
Benny Anderson (disambiguation)
Bertram Anderson (c.1505–71) English politician and MP for Newcastle-upon-Tyne
Bill Anderson (disambiguation)
Billy Anderson (disambiguation)
Bob Anderson (disambiguation)
Bobby Anderson (disambiguation)
Brad Anderson (disambiguation)
Brady Anderson (born 1964), American baseball player
Brent F. Anderson (1932–2013), American politician
Brett Anderson (disambiguation)
Brian Anderson (disambiguation)
Brittny Anderson, Canadian politician
Brooke Anderson (born 1978), American television personality, co-host of The Insider
Bryan Anderson (disambiguation)
Bud Anderson (born 1922), American aviator and flying ace

C 
Cal Anderson (1948–1995), American politician
Calvin Anderson (American football) (born 1996), American football player
Carl Anderson (disambiguation)
Carlotta Adele Anderson (1876–1956), teacher of the deaf and dumb
Casey Anderson (naturalist) (born 1975), American naturalist and TV presenter
Chantelle Anderson (born 1981), American basketball player
Charles Anderson (disambiguation)
Chase Anderson (born 1987), American baseball player
Cheryl A. M. Anderson, American epidemiologist
Chic Anderson (1931–1979), American horse race announcer
Chris Anderson (disambiguation)
C. J. Anderson (born 1991), American football player
Clayton Conrad Anderson (born 1959), American NASA astronaut
Cliff Anderson (1944–2021), American basketball player
Cliff Anderson (American football) (1929–1979), American football player
Clinton Presba Anderson (1895–1975), American politician
Clive Anderson, British lawyer and comedian
Colin Anderson (disambiguation), multiple people
Cora Reynolds Anderson, American politician                                
Corey Anderson (cricketer), New Zealand cricketer
Cornealious Michael Anderson III, American robber
Craig Anderson (disambiguation)
Curt Anderson (born 1949), Maryland legislator and broadcast journalist

D
Daphne Anderson (1922–2013), British actor
Dale Anderson (disambiguation)
Dane Anderson, Australian cricket player
Darius Anderson (born 1997), American football player
David Anderson (disambiguation)
Debra R. Anderson (1949–2022), American politician
Dennis Anderson (disambiguation)
Derek Anderson (disambiguation)
Des Anderson (born 1940), Northern Irish footballer
Donna Anderson (born 1939), American actress
Dres Anderson (born 1992), American football player

E
E. N. Anderson (born 1941), American professor of anthropology
E. Riley Anderson (1932–2018), American judge
Edmund E. Anderson, American auto designer
Eduardo Belmont Anderson (born c. 1945), Peruvian billionaire businessman
Edward L. Anderson, United States Navy admiral
Elizabeth S. Anderson, American philosopher
Ellen Anderson (born 1959), American politician
Elton Anderson, American swamp pop singer
Ernest Masson Anderson (1877–1960), Scottish geologist
Ernestine Anderson (1928–2016), American jazz and blues singer
Ernie Anderson, American voice actor and radio personality
Ernie Anderson (footballer), (1896–unknown), Scottish footballer
Eugene Anderson (1927–2010), American trial lawyer
Evelyn M. Anderson (1899–1985), physiologist and biochemist
Ever Anderson (born 2007), American actress and model

F
Felipe Anderson (born 1993), Brazilian midfield footballer
Fleur Anderson, British politician
Floyd E. Anderson (1891–1976), New York politician and judge
Francis Anderson (disambiguation)
Frank Anderson (baseball coach), American college baseball coach
Freya Anderson (born 2001), English freestyle swimmer

G
Galusha Anderson, American theologian
Garret Anderson, American baseball player
Gary Anderson (disambiguation)
Gene Anderson (wrestler) (1939–1991), American professional wrestler
George Frederick Anderson, British musician and Master of the Queen's Music
George Whelan Anderson Jr., U.S. Naval officer, admiral, Chief of Naval Operations
Geraint Anderson, British analyst and columnist
Gerald Anderson, Filipino celebrity
Gerry Anderson, British television producer and puppeteer
Gillian Anderson (born 1968), American actress
Glenn Anderson, Canadian ice hockey player

H
Harry Anderson (1952–2018), American actor and magician
Harry Anderson (artist), American illustrator
Hedli Anderson (1907–1990), English singer and actor, second wife of the poet Louis MacNeice
Henry Anderson (disambiguation)
Herbert Anderson (1917–1994), American actor
Herbert H. Anderson (1913–2001), American organic chemist
Herbert L. Anderson (1914–1988), American nuclear physicist
Ho Che Anderson, American comic book artist
Hugh C. Anderson (1851–1915), Lieutenant Governor of Tennessee

I
Ian Anderson (disambiguation)
Ijah Anderson (born 1975), English footballer
Ivie Anderson (1904–1949), American jazz singer

J
Jace Anderson, American scriptwriter
Jade Anderson, English singer-songwriter
Jack Anderson (disambiguation)
James Anderson (disambiguation)
Jane Anderson (born 1954), American actress, screenwriter and director
Janet Anderson Perkin (1921–2012), Canadian baseball player and curler
Jared Anderson (boxer), American boxer
Jason Anderson (American football), baseball player
Jeff Anderson, American actor
Jeffrey Anderson (radio producer) (1928–2014), Canadian music critic, journalist, and television and radio producer
Jerald C. Anderson (1934–2014), American dentist and politician
Jerime Anderson (born 1989), American basketball player
Jesse Anderson, American murderer
Jesse Anderson (musician) (1940–2014), American blues singer-songwriter and musician
Jessica Anderson (disambiguation)
Jessie Anderson (The Walking Dead), fictional character
Jodi Anderson (born 1957), American heptathlete
John Anderson (disambiguation)
Jon Anderson (born 1944), English musician and singer, with Yes
Jonathan Anderson (American football) (born 1991), American footballer
Jonathan Anderson (fashion designer) (born 1984), Northern Irish fashion designer
Josh Anderson (disambiguation)
Joyce Anderson (1923–2014), American furniture designer and woodworker
Joyce Anderson (artist) (died 2022), Canadian painter and art teacher
Judith Anderson (1897–1992), Australian film actor

K

Karen Anderson (disambiguation)
Karl Anderson (athlete) (1900–1989), American hurdler
Kay Anderson (1902–1974), English artist
Keith Anderson (born 1968), American country musician 
Keith Anderson (disambiguation)
Ken or Kenneth Anderson (disambiguation)
Kevin Anderson (disambiguation)
Kip Anderson (1938–2007), American soul blues and R&B singer and songwriter
Kyle Anderson (basketball)  (born 1993), American basketball player

L
Laurie Anderson (born 1947), American singer and performance artist
Lennart Anderson (1928–2015), American painter
Leroy Anderson (1908–1975), American composer
Linda Anderson (disambiguation), multiple people
Lindsay Anderson (1923–1994), British film director
Liz Anderson (1930–2011), American country music singer
Loni Anderson (born 1945), American actress
Lorna Anderson, Scottish soprano
Lory Anderson (born 1982), Paraguayan actor and presenter
Louie Anderson, American comedian
Louis Anderson, New Zealand rugby player
Louis B. Anderson (1870–1946), American politician
Lucy Anderson (1797–1878), English pianist
Lynn Anderson (1947–2015), American country music singer

M
Madge Easton Anderson (1896–1982), Scottish lawyer
Malcolm Playfair Anderson (1879–1919), American zoologist
Marc Anderson, American percussionist
Marcia M. Anderson, first African-American woman to attain major general in the US Army Reserve
Marian Anderson (1897–1993), American opera singer; first African-American singer at the Metropolitan Opera
Marisa Anderson, American guitarist
Margaret Anderson (disambiguation)
Marge Anderson (1932–2013), American politician
Marie Anderson (1916–1996), American journalist
Mark Anderson (disambiguation)
Martin Anderson (disambiguation)
Martina Anderson (born 1962), Northern Irish politician
Marques Anderson (born 1979), founder of World Education Foundation
Mary Anderson (actress, born 1918) (1918–2014), American actor
Matt Anderson (volleyball) (born 1987) American volleyball player, Member of the United States men's team/ Olympic team
Maurice Anderson (American football) (born 1975), American football player
Maxie Anderson (1934–1983), American balloonist
Melissa Sue Anderson (born 1962), American actor
Melody Anderson (born 1955), Canadian-American actor and social worker
Merle K. Anderson (1904–1982), American politician and farmer
Michael Anderson (disambiguation)
Michelle Anderson (born 1967), American President of Brooklyn College, and a scholar on rape law
Mignon Anderson (1892–1983), American actress
Mignon Holland Anderson (born 1945), American writer
Mike Anderson (disambiguation)
Miller Anderson (disambiguation)
Moses Anderson (1928–2013), American Roman Catholic bishop

N
Nestell Kipp Anderson (1885–1967), American farmer who spearheaded the Appalachian Trail in Connecticut
Nick Anderson (disambiguation)
Nicole Gale Anderson (born 1990), American actor

O
Oskar Johann Viktor Anderson (1887–1960), Russian-German statistician
Ottis Anderson (born 1957), American football player

P
Pamela Anderson (born 1967), Canadian-American model and actor
Pamela Sue Anderson, English philosopher
Paul Anderson (disambiguation)
Penny Anderson, British ecologist
Penny Anderson (rugby union) (born 1977), Australian rugby player
Perry Anderson (born 1938), British historian and essayist
Pete D. Anderson (1931–2013), American jockey and Thoroughbred racehorse trainer
Peter Anderson (disambiguation)
Philip Warren Anderson (1923–2020), American theoretical physicist, the 1977 Nobel laureate in Physics
Phyllis Margery Anderson (1901–1957), Australian pathologist
Poul Anderson (1926–2001), American science fiction author

R
Reuben V. Anderson (born 1943), American attorney
Richard Anderson (disambiguation)
Ricky Anderson (American football) (born 1963), American football player
Robert Anderson (disambiguation)
Rodney Anderson (Texas politician) (born 1968), American politician
Rodney Anderson (American football) (born 1996), American football player
Rona Anderson (1926–2013), Scottish actor
Rory Anderson (born 1992), American football player
Rupert Anderson (1859–1944), English footballer
Rudolf Anderson (1927–1962), U.S. Air Force pilot and first recipient of the Air Force Cross
Russell Anderson (born 1978), Scottish footballer
Ruthadell Anderson (1922–2018), American textile artist and sculptor
Ryan Anderson (disambiguation)

S
Sam Anderson (rugby league) (born 1991), Australian rugby league player
Samuel Anderson (disambiguation)
Sari Anderson (born 1978), American multisport and endurance athlete
Sean Anderson (born 1988), aka Big Sean, American rapper
Shaun Anderson (born 1994), American baseball player
Sherwood Anderson (1876–1941), American writer
Siwan Anderson, Canadian economist and professor
Sonia Anderson (1944–2020), British archivist
Sonny Anderson (born 1970), Brazilian footballer
Sophie Gengembre Anderson (1823–1903), French-born British artist
Sparky Anderson (1934–2010), American baseball manager
Stan Anderson (1933–2018), English footballer
Stephen R. Anderson (born 1943) American linguist
Stephen Wayne Anderson (1953–2002), executed murderer of Elizabeth Lyman
Steve Anderson (athlete) (1906–1988), American athlete
Steven Anderson (pastor) (born 1981), American preacher
Sunshine Anderson (born 1974), American R&B and soul singer and songwriter
Sylvia Anderson (1927–2016), English television and film producer, co-creator of TV series with Gerry Anderson

T
Teyona Anderson fashion model
Terry Anderson (disambiguation)
Theodore Wilbur Anderson (1918–2016), American statistician, co-inventor of the Anderson–Darling test
Thomas Anderson (disambiguation)
Tim Anderson (disambiguation)
Tom Anderson  (born 1970), American co-founder of the social networking website Myspace
Tyler Anderson (born 1989), American baseball player

V
Vernon Andy Anderson (1896–1999), American missionary
Vicki Anderson (born 1939), American soul singer 
Victor Anderson (disambiguation)
Viv Anderson (born 1954), English footballer
Vivian Anderson (baseball) (1921–2012), All-American Girls Professional Baseball League player

W
Warren Anderson (disambiguation)
Wayne Anderson (disambiguation)
Wendell Anderson (1933–2016), Minnesota politician
Wes Anderson, film director
William Anderson (disambiguation)

Family
Anderson family, a group of American professional wrestlers who are billed as relatives:
Gene Anderson (wrestler) (1933–1991), fictional brother
Lawrence Heinemi Lars Anderson (born 1939, real name Lawrence Heinemi), fictional brother
Ole Anderson (born 1942, real name Alan Rogowski), fictional brother
Arn Anderson (born 1958, real name Martin Lunde), fictional cousin
Brad Anderson (wrestler) (born 1969), real-life son of Gene
 Bryant Anderson, born 1970 as Brian Rogowski, real-life son of Ole
C. W. Anderson (born 1971; real name Chris Wright), relationship undetermined but billed as a part of the "family"
Karl Anderson (born 1980; real name Chad Allegra), relationship undetermined but billed as a part of the "family"
 Brock Anderson (born 1997; real name Brock Lunde), real-life son of Arn

Fictional characters
 Abigail "Abby" Anderson, of The Last of Us Part II
Alexander Anderson (Hellsing), in the Japanese anime/manga series
 Amy Anderson, name of Sailor Mercury in some English adaptations
Blaine Anderson, from Glee
 Captain David Anderson, from the Mass Effect series
 Dru Anderson, character from the book series Lilith Saintcrow Strange Angels
 Hank Anderson, from the video game Detroit: Become Human
Jesse Andersen, from Yu-Gi-Oh! GX
 Kai Anderson, from American Horror Story: Cult
 Mike Anderson, of the Nintendo video games Battle Clash and Metal Combat: Falcon's Revenge
Sgt. Suzanne Anderson, in Police Woman (TV series)
 Thomas A. Anderson, birthname of fictional character Neo (The Matrix)
Trent Anderson, character from Dan Brown's novel The Lost Symbol
 Winter Anderson, from American Horror Story: Cult
Sgt. Zeke Anderson, character in the Tour of Duty TV series
Judge Anderson, from Judge Dredd
Major Anderson, in the Ender's Game series
Mr. Anderson (Beavis and Butt-head), neighbor from Beavis and Butthead

See also
Andersen
Clan Anderson
Earl of Yarborough, Peerage created in the United Kingdom (Anderson-Pelham family)
Lord Anderson (disambiguation)
Anderson Baronets, nine British baronetcies, all extinct

References

Danish-language surnames
English-language surnames
Swedish-language surnames
Scottish surnames
Patronymic surnames